Ireland competed at the 1992 Summer Paralympics in Barcelona, Spain. 58 competitors from Ireland won 7 medals including 3 silver and 4 bronze and finished 43rd in the medal table.

See also 
 Ireland at the Paralympics
 Ireland at the 1992 Summer Olympics

References 

Ireland at the Paralympics
1992 in Irish sport
Nations at the 1992 Summer Paralympics